The Nuristani languages, also known as Kafiri languages, are one of the three groups within the Indo-Iranian language family, alongside the much larger Indo-Aryan and Iranian groups. They have approximately 130,000 speakers primarily in eastern Afghanistan and a few adjacent valleys in Khyber Pakhtunkhwa's Chitral District, Pakistan. The region inhabited by the Nuristanis is located in the southern Hindu Kush mountains, and is drained by the Alingar River in the west, the Pech River in the center, and the Landai Sin and Kunar rivers in the east. The languages were previously often grouped with Indo-Aryan (Dardic sub-group) or Iranian until they were finally classified as forming a third branch in Indo-Iranian.

Languages 

 Northern:
 Kamkata-vari (Bashgali, includes the dialects Kata-vari, Kamviri, Shekhani and Mumviri) 40,000 speakers
 Wasi-wari (Prasuni) 8,000 speakers
 Southern:
 Askunu (Ashkun) 40,000 speakers
 Waigali (Kalasha-ala) 12,000 speakers
 Tregami (Gambiri) 3,500 speakers
 Zemiaki 500 speakers

History 
The Nuristani languages were not described in literature until the 19th century. The older name for the region was Kafiristan and the languages were termed Kafiri or Kafiristani, but the terms have been replaced by the present ones since the conversion of the region to Islam in 1896. The Kalash people are very close to the Nuristani people in terms of culture and historic religion, and are divided between speakers of the Nuristani language, Kalasha-ala, and an Indo-Aryan language, Kalaṣa-mun.

There are three different theories about the origins of the Nuristani languages and their place within the Indo-Iranian languages:
 following the studies of Georg Morgenstierne, Nuristani has generally been regarded as one of three primary sub-groups of Indo-Iranian (alongside Iranian and Indo-Aryan);
 suggestions that Nuristani may instead be a branch of the Indo-Aryan subgroup, due to the evident similarity with Dardic languages, and;
 it has also been proposed that Nuristani originated within the Iranian sub-group, and was later influenced by an Indo-Aryan language, such as Dardic.

The languages are spoken by tribal peoples in an extremely isolated mountainous region of the Hindu Kush, one that has never been subject to any real central authority in modern times. This area is located along the northeastern border of present-day Afghanistan and adjacent portions of the northwest of present-day Pakistan. These languages have not received the attention linguists would like to give them. Considering the very small number of people estimated to speak them, they must be considered endangered languages.

Many Nuristani people now speak other languages, such as Dari and Pashto (two official languages of Afghanistan) and Chitrali in Pakistan.

Proto-Nuristani 

The earliest divergence of Nuristani from the other Indo-Iranian languages may be indicated by the fact that the Ruki sound law does not apply after *u: e.g. Kam-viri  'mouse'.

Nuristani shares with Iranian the merger of the tenuis and breathy-voiced consonants, and the fronting of the Proto-Indo-Iranian primary palatal consonants. The latter were retained as dental affricates in Proto-Nuristani, in contrast to simplification to sibilants (in most of Iranian) or interdentals (in Persian).

Many Nuristani languages have subject–object–verb (SOV) word order, like most of the other Indo-Iranian languages, and unlike the adjacent Dardic Kashmiri language, which has verb-second word order.

See also 
 Dardic languages

References

Bibliography 

 Decker, Kendall D. (1992) Languages of Chitral. Sociolinguistic Survey of Northern Pakistan, 5. Islamabad: National Institute of Pakistan Studies, Quaid-i-Azam University and Summer Institute of Linguistics. 
 Grjunberg, A. L. (1971): K dialektologii dardskich jazykov (glangali i zemiaki). Indijskaja i iranskaja filologija: Voprosy dialektologii. Moscow.
 Morgenstierne, Georg (1926) Report on a Linguistic Mission to Afghanistan. Instituttet for Sammenlignende Kulturforskning, Serie C I-2. Oslo. 
 Jettmar, Karl (1985) Religions of the Hindu Kush 
 J. P. Mallory, In Search of the Indo-Europeans: Language, Archaeology and Myth, Thames and Hudson, 1989.
 James P. Mallory & Douglas Q. Adams, "Indo-Iranian Languages", Encyclopedia of Indo-European Culture, Fitzroy Dearborn, 1997.
 Strand, Richard F. "NURESTÂNI LANGUAGES" in Encyclopædia Iranica

External links 
 Reiko and Jun's Japanese Kalash Page (in English)
 Hindi/Urdu-English-Kalasha-Khowar-Nuristani-Pashtu Comparative Word List
 Richard Strand's Nuristân Site This site is the primary source on the linguistics and ethnography of Nuristân and neighboring regions, collected and analyzed over the last forty years by the leading scholar on Nuristân.

 
Languages of Afghanistan
Languages of Pakistan